Carex divulsa, the grey sedge, is a species of flowering plant in the genus Carex, native to Macaronesia, Europe, northwest Africa, the Caucasus region, and the Middle East as far east as Turkmenistan. It has been introduced to northeast Argentina, the District of Columbia and Pennsylvania in the United States, Ontario in Canada, the North Island of New Zealand, and Tasmania and Victoria in Australia. It is the namesake of the Carex divulsa aggregate.

References

divulsa
Plants described in 1787
Flora of Malta